Chrestinah Thembi Kgatlana (born 2 May 1996) is a South African professional soccer player who plays as a forward for NWSL club Racing Louisville FC and the South Africa women's national team.

Club career

Houston Dash 
In February 2018, Kgatlana moved to the United States to join the Houston Dash in the National Women's Soccer League. She was brought in by her former national team coach Vera Pauw. Kgatlana joined her South African teammates Janine van Wyk and Linda Motlhalo in Houston. Kgatlana made 16 appearances with Houston and she scored 2 goals.

Owing to her accepting a move overseas, Kgatlana was waived by the Houston Dash on 6 February 2019.

Beijing BG Phoenix 
On 22 February 2019, Kgatlana was announced as having signed with Beijing BG Phoenix F.C. in the Chinese Women's Super League on a one-year deal. She was joined by South African teammate Linda Motlhalo who also made the move from Houston to China.

Kgatlana scored six league goals in 10 appearances during the 2019 Chinese Women's Super League campaign, helping her Beijing BG Phoenix side to a fifth-place finish.

SL Benfica 
On 27 January 2020 she signed with SL Benfica. On 1 February 2020 she made her debut with the club being subbed on in a 3–1 win over Braga in Taça da Liga Feminina.

Prior to their cancellation owing to the COVID-19 pandemic, Kgatlana helped Benfica to the final of both Portuguese Cup and Taca da Liga Femenina competitions as well as the top of the league table. The result was enough to qualify the club for the UEFA Women's Champions League for the first time in their history.

SD Eibar 
Kgatlana's spell at Benfica came to an early end owing to complications arising from the COVID-19 crisis, with a salary cap introduced across Portuguese women's football. On 27 July 2020, it was announced that she had joined newly promoted Spanish Primera Division side SD Eibar on a one-year contract. Kgatlana made her debut on 4 October 2020 in a 1–0 victory over Real Betis, before opening her goalscoring account the following week in a 2–2 draw against Levante.

On 31 October 2020, Kgatlana scored her second goal for the club on her first start in a 1–0 victory over Espanyol, however she was forced off with the game still in the first half due to a minor injury. Upon her return from injury, she immediately returned to goalscoring form with a stunning strike in a 3–1 defeat to Real Madrid having once again entered from the substitutes bench.

International career
Kgatlana represented her country at the 2016 Summer Olympics and the 2018 Africa Women Cup of Nations, where she won the Player of the Tournament and was the highest goal scorer. She also represented South Africa at the 2019 FIFA Women's World Cup in France, where she scored her country's first goal ever in the tournament.

International goals
Scores and results list South Africa's goal tally first

Career statistics

Club

Honours
Benfica
 Taça da Liga: 2019–20

International
 COSAFA Women's Championship: 2017
 Africa Women Cup of Nations: runner-up 2018

Individual
 CAF Africa Women Cup of Nations Best Player: 2018
CAF Africa Women Cup of Nations Top Scorer: 2018
 CAF African Women's Footballer of the Year 2018
CAF African Goal of the Year: 2018
Cyprus Cup Best player 2018
COSAFA Women's Championship Player of the Tournament: 2017

References

External links
 
 Profile at Confederation of African Football (CAF)

1996 births
Living people
Place of birth missing (living people)
South African women's soccer players
Women's association football forwards
Houston Dash players
Beijing BG Phoenix F.C. players
S.L. Benfica (women) footballers
SD Eibar Femenino players
Atlético Madrid Femenino players
National Women's Soccer League players
Primera División (women) players
Campeonato Nacional de Futebol Feminino players
South Africa women's international soccer players
Olympic soccer players of South Africa
Footballers at the 2016 Summer Olympics
2019 FIFA Women's World Cup players
African Women's Footballer of the Year winners
South African expatriate soccer players
South African expatriate sportspeople in the United States
Expatriate women's soccer players in the United States
South African expatriate sportspeople in China
Expatriate women's footballers in China
South African expatriate sportspeople in Portugal
Expatriate women's footballers in Portugal
South African expatriate sportspeople in Spain
Expatriate women's footballers in Spain